Gilles Colon (born July 25, 1981 in Port-au-Prince, Haiti) is a former Canadian Football League wide receiver who played for three seasons for the Winnipeg Blue Bombers and BC Lions. He won the 94th Grey Cup in 2006 as a member of the Lions. He played CIS football for the Bishop's Gaiters. Gilles Colon played from 2004 to 2006 during his career with the Winnipeg Blue Bombers and BC Lions. Colon caught 28 passes for 365 yards and 2 receiving touchdowns in his career.

References

External links
Canadian Football League

1981 births
Sportspeople from Port-au-Prince
Haitian emigrants to Canada
BC Lions players
Bishop's Gaiters football players
Canadian football wide receivers
Living people
Winnipeg Blue Bombers players
Haitian players of Canadian football